Abdullah Afzal (born 1989) is a British actor and stand-up comedian.

Early life
Afzal is of British-Pakistani descent from Cheetham Hill, Manchester, England. He has three older brothers, two older sisters and a younger half-brother. He attended Abraham Moss High School in North Manchester.

Afzal trained for three years to be a hafiz.

Career
In 2007, Afzal had his first acting role as a young student in a short film called Raamis (originally called Extraordinary Rendition). Between 2008 and 2011, he starred as Asif in two seasons of BBC Three sitcom Lunch Monkeys. Since 2012, he has portrayed the character of Amjad Malik in BBC One's Citizen Khan.

In February 2014, Afzal presented the Christmas comedy specials on BBC Asian Network. In July 2015, he performed stand-up at the Eid Special Comedy Night at The Comedy Store in London.

In July 2014, Afzal played two roles in BBC Radio 4's By a Young Officer: Churchill on the North West Frontier.

In 2017, he appeared as Jahid in the romantic comedy film Finding Fatimah.

In 2021, Afzal wrote, starred, and directed Cinder’aliyah, Britain’s first Muslim pantomime. The pantomime is due to tour again in 2022.

Personal life
He works at Manchester Airport to supplement his acting career, and lives in Manchester with his wife Uzma, who he married in 2015.

Afzal’s family originate from Rawalpindi district, Punjab.

Filmography

Film

Television

Radio

See also
Islamic humour
British Pakistani
List of British Pakistanis

References

External links

1989 births
Living people
English Muslims
English people of Pakistani descent
English male comedians
English stand-up comedians
English comedy writers
Muslim male comedians
English male television actors
English male actors of South Asian descent
21st-century English comedians
21st-century English male actors
Comedians from Manchester
Male actors from Manchester
People from Cheetham Hill